Oppido Lucano is a town and comune in the province of Potenza, in the Southern Italian region of Basilicata. It is bounded by the comuni of Acerenza, Cancellara, Genzano di Lucania, Irsina and Tolve.

Main sights

Church and Convent of St. Anthony
Rock church of St. Antuono
Norman castle, likely built in 1047-1051

People
Obadiah the Proselyte

References

Cities and towns in Basilicata